Derwent is a civil parish in the High Peak district of Derbyshire, England.  The parish contains four listed buildings that are recorded in the National Heritage List for England.  All the listed buildings are designated at Grade II, the lowest of the three grades, which is applied to "buildings of national importance and special interest".  Following the building of Ladybower Reservoir the village of Derwent was flooded.  The listed buildings consist of the dam at the south end of the Derwent Reservoir, a war memorial moved from the village, a farmhouse and outbuilding, and a house and former school, later a community centre.


Buildings

References

Citations

Sources

 

Lists of listed buildings in Derbyshire